Jal Pari is Atif Aslam's first solo album after he left the Pakistani rock group Jal, released on 17 July 2004. Two of his songs from the album were used by Bollywood film directors. Three songs were also selected for the Hollywood film Man Push Cart (2005).

Accolades
Jal Pari was declared the "Best Selling Album of the Year" for two consecutive years for 2004 and 2005 by the Pakistani newspaper The News International. The song "Bheegi Yaadein" was named the Most Downloaded Pakistani Song Ever from various Pakistani music websites by DAWN newspaper.

Copyright issues
Since Jal's album Aadat and Jal Pari shared certain tracks such as "Aadat", "Bheegi Yaadein" and "Ankhon Se", a war over rights began which resulted in both sides claiming to possess hard proof to support their respective claims that they alone owned these songs. Goher Mumtaz of Jal filled a legal lawsuit against Aslam for copyright infringement, which resulted in the court awarding the rights to both parties as both Aslam and Jal shared some songs on their albums.

Track listing

Awards

References

2004 albums
Atif Aslam albums
Urdu-language albums